Anita Wagner (née Husarić; ; born 27 June 1994) is a Bosnian tennis player.

To date, she has won 13 doubles titles on the ITF Circuit. On 16 December 2013, she reached her best singles ranking of world No. 633. On 19 June 2017, she peaked at No. 255 in the WTA doubles rankings.

Playing for Bosnia and Herzegovina Fed Cup team, Husarić has a win–loss record of 9–28, as of November 2022.

In January 2022, she changed her name to Anita Wagner.

ITF Circuit finals

Doubles: 34 (13 titles, 21 runner-ups)

References

External links
 
 
 

1994 births
Living people
Sportspeople from Tuzla
Bosnia and Herzegovina female tennis players